The Whitewater–Baldy complex Fire was a wildfire that started on May 9, 2012, in Catron County, New Mexico, USA. The area of the fire well surpassed that of the Las Conchas Fire of 2011, making Whitewater–Baldy the largest wildfire in New Mexico state history until it was surpassed in May 2022 by the Calf Canyon/Hermits Peak Fire. The Whitewater-Baldy Fire Complex burned mostly within the Gila Wilderness, which includes the fire's namesake mountain, Whitewater Baldy.

Summary
The fire started as two separate fires, the Whitewater fire which was detected on May 16 and the smaller Baldy fire that started earlier on May 9, both from lightning strikes. The fires merged on 24 May. The fire has burned more than a dozen residences, caused the evacuation of several small towns, and forced the closure of the Gila Cliff Dwellings National Monument and the Catwalk Recreation Area above Glenwood, New Mexico. Rain showers in mid-July helped firefighters reach 95% containment by July 23 and 100% containment by July 31.

Government response
On May 15, 2012, as a result of the Whitewater–Baldy complex fire, governor Susana Martinez declared the entire state of New Mexico to be in a drought. Martinez issued the formal drought declaration to help farmers, ranchers, and others secure federal drought funding. Martinez stated that in addition to "the work we're doing at the state level to assist communities facing serious drought conditions, I'm hopeful this declaration will assist them in securing any available federal funding as well." Martinez stated that "As a result of this fire, small businesses are unquestionably feeling the impact." As a result, she encouraged them to apply for SBA loans. On June 8, Martinez declared Catron County, New Mexico to be in a state of emergency. The declaration made funds available for both state and local response to the fire, and for community needs.

Notes

External links
Whitewater Baldy Complex at Inciweb.org

Wildfires in New Mexico
Gila National Forest
2012 wildfires in the United States
2012 in New Mexico
History of Catron County, New Mexico